The 2022 Australia Cup preliminary rounds were the qualifying competition to decide 23 of the 32 teams to take part in the 2022 Australia Cup. The competition commenced in February and was completed in October.

Initially known during the planning of the preliminary rounds as the FFA Cup, the renaming of the competition was announced during the 2021 FFA Cup Final.

Schedule
The fixtures for the competition are as follows.

 Some round dates in respective Federations overlap due to separate scheduling of Zones/Sub-Zones.

Format
The preliminary rounds structures are as follows, and refer to the different levels in the unofficial Australian soccer league system:

First round:
104 Victorian clubs level 8 and below entered this stage.

Second round:
120 New South Wales clubs level 6 and below entered this stage.
48 Northern New South Wales clubs level 4 and below entered this stage.
83 Queensland clubs (level 5 and below) entered this stage.
100 Victorian clubs (52 from the previous round and 48 teams from levels 5 and 6) entered this stage.
23 Western Australian clubs from level 5 and below, including from regional leagues, entered this stage.

Third round:
12 Australian Capital Territory clubs from level 3 and below entered this stage.
88 New South Wales Clubs (66 from the previous round and 22 teams from levels 4–5) entered this stage.
42 Northern New South Wales clubs (33 from the previous round and 11 level 3) entered this stage.
83 Queensland clubs (50 from the previous round and 33 teams from level 4 and below) entered this stage.
40 South Australian clubs from level 3 and below entered this stage.
10 Tasmanian clubs from level 3 and below entered this stage.
79 Victorian clubs (55 from the previous round and 24 teams from level 5) entered this stage.
42 Western Australian clubs (18 from the previous round and 24 teams from levels 3 and 4) entered this stage.

Fourth round:
16 Australian Capital Territory clubs (4 from the previous round and 12 teams from levels 2–3) entered this stage.
64 New South Wales Clubs (44 from the previous round and 20 teams from levels 2–3) entered this stage.
32 Northern New South Wales clubs (21 from the previous round and 11 level 2) entered this stage.
11 Northern Territory clubs (7 from Norzone (Darwin) and 4 from FICA (Alice Springs)) from levels 2–3 entered this stage.
64 Queensland clubs (42 from the previous round and 22 teams from level 2 and 3) entered this stage.
32 South Australian clubs (21 from the previous round and 11 teams from level 2) entered this stage.
16 Tasmanian clubs (6 from the previous round and 10 teams from level 2 and 3) entered this stage.
75 Victorian clubs (40 from the previous round and 35 teams from levels 2–4) entered this stage.
32 Western Australian clubs (21 from the previous round and 11 teams from level 2) entered this stage.

Fifth round:
8 Australian Capital Territory clubs progressed to this stage.
32 New South Wales clubs progressed to this stage.
16 Northern New South Wales clubs progressed to this stage.
8 Northern Territory clubs (6 from the previous round and 2 Norzone (Darwin) teams from level 2) entered this stage.
32 Queensland clubs progressed to this stage.
16 South Australian clubs progressed to this stage.
8 Tasmanian clubs progressed to this stage.
40 Victorian clubs progressed to this stage.
16 Western Australian clubs progressed to this stage.

Sixth round:
4 Australian Capital Territory clubs progressed to this stage.
16 New South Wales clubs progressed to this stage.
8 Northern New South Wales clubs progressed to this stage.
4 Northern Territory clubs progressed to this stage.
16 Queensland clubs progressed to this stage.
8 South Australian clubs progressed to this stage.
4 Tasmanian clubs progressed to this stage.
20 Victorian clubs progressed to this stage.
8 Western Australian clubs progressed to this stage.

Seventh round:
2 Australian Capital Territory clubs progressed to this stage, which doubled as the Final of the Federation Cup.
8 New South Wales clubs progressed to this stage. The 4 winners also qualified to the final rounds of the Waratah Cup.
4 Northern New South Wales clubs progressed to this stage.
2 Northern Territory clubs progressed to this stage, and which doubled as the NT Australia Cup Final.
8 Queensland clubs progressed to this stage; 2 from Central and North Queensland, and 6 from South East Queensland.
4 South Australian clubs progressed to this stage. The 2 winners qualified for the Grand Final of the Federation Cup.
2 Tasmanian clubs progressed to this stage, which doubled as the Grand Final of the Milan Lakoseljac Cup.
10 Victorian clubs progressed to this stage. The 5 winners also qualified to the final rounds of the Dockerty Cup.
4 Western Australian clubs progressed to this stage. The 2 winners also qualified for the Final of the Football West State Cup.

Play-off round:
 The four lowest-ranked teams in the 2021–22 A-League Men played-off for two spots in the Round of 32.

Key to Abbreviations

First round

Notes:
 w/o = Walkover
 † = after extra time

Second round

Notes:
 w/o = Walkover
 † = after extra time
 NSW Byes – Bulli FC (6), Castle Hill RSL Rockets (-), Como Jannali (-), Cooks River Titans (-), Dundas United (-), Eschol Park (-), Fairfield Patrician Brothers (6), Gunners SC (-), Gwandalan Summerland Point (7), Kiama Quarriers (7), Knox United (-), Kogarah Waratah (-).
 NNSW Byes – Bellingen FC (-), Camden Haven Redbacks (-), Charlestown Junior (7), Coutts Crossing Cougars (-), Iona FC (-), Kempsey Saints (-), Mayfield United Junior (6), Metford Cobras (7), Moore Creek (-), Nambucca Strikers (-), Newcastle Suns (4), Northern Storm (-), Oxley Vale Attunga (-), Port Macquarie Saints (-), South Maitland (6), Souths United (-), Taree Wildcats (-), Wingham Warriors (-).
 QLD Byes – Fraser Flames (5), Across The Waves FC (5), United Park Eagles (5), Central FC (5), Capricorn Coast (5), Nerimbera FC (5), Robina City (5), Noosa Lions (5), Kingscliff District (5), Moggill (7), The Gap (5), St. George Willawong (5), Bribie Island Tigers (8), Bayside United (5), Kangaroo Point Rovers (7), Brighton Bulldogs (8), Maroochydore (5).
 VIC Byes – Watsonia Heights (8), Skye United (6), Knox City (6), Williamstown (7), Altona East Phoenix (6), Hume United (6), Ashburton United (7), Monbulk Rangers (6), Sunbury United (7), Hoppers Crossing (6).
 WA Byes – Albany Caledonian (10), Busselton City (10), Chipolopolo FC (10), Emerald FC (5), Greyhounds CSC (10), Hamersley Rovers (5), Joondanna Blues (10), Kwinana United (5), Northern City (9), Perth AFC (8), Riverside CFC (10), South Perth United (6), Yanchep United (9).

Third round

Notes:
 w/o = Walkover
 † = after extra time
 ACT Byes – ANU (3), Canberra White Eagles (3), Tuggeranong United (3), Wagga City Wanderers (3).
 QLD Bye – Brothers Townsville (-).
 SA Byes – Port Adelaide Pirates (3), Tea Tree Gully City (-).
 TAS Byes – Burnie United (3), Beachside FC (3).
 VIC Bye – Beaumaris SC (5).

Fourth round

Notes:
 w/o = Walkover
 † = after extra time
 NT Bye: Darwin Hearts (3).
 VIC Byes: FC Bulleen Lions (3), Dandenong City (2), Elwood City (7), Fitzroy City (5), Watsonia Heights (8).

Fifth round

Notes:

 † = after extra time

Sixth round

Notes:
 † = after extra time

Seventh round

Notes
 † = after extra time

A-League Men playoffs

Notes

References

External links
 Official website

FFA Cup preliminary
2022 in Australian soccer
Australia Cup preliminary rounds